Donglin Temple is a Buddhist temple approximately  from Jiujiang, in the north of Jiangxi province, China. Built in 386 CE at the foot of Mountain Lu by Huiyuan, founder of the Pure Land Buddhism, it is well known for how long it has stood without collapsing.

In the Tang dynasty, Jianzhen made several trips to Japan for the mission of preaching Buddhism. As a result, Huiyuan and the doctrine of Donglin Temple began to spread in Japan. Donglin Temple made contributions to improve cultural exchanges and friendly visits between China and Nepal, India, Japan.

The monastery reached its peak of influence during the Tang Dynasty (618–907 CE), but was severely damaged during the Taiping Rebellion and was almost destroyed during the Republican period (1912–1949) of Chinese history.

History

Eastern Jin dynasty
Donglin Temple was originally built as "Longquan Jingshe" in 386 by a prominent Buddhist monk named Huiyuan, founder of the Pure Land Sect of Buddhism, under the Eastern Jin dynasty (266–420). During his time as abbot, he disseminated Pure Land Buddhism for 30 years, and attracted large numbers of practitioners. He organized the White Lotus Society, a community gathered 123 Chinese and foreign monks and scholars. Indian Buddhist monks Tanmoti and Sengjia Tipo also delivered Buddhism at that time.

Tang dynasty
Jianzhen, an exceptional Buddhist monk, lectured the sutras and precepts in the temple before going to Japan. In 753, in the 12th year of Tianbao period, Zhi'en, a monk in Donglin Temple, arrived in Japan with Jianzhen.

Structures

Guest houses
Guest houses are provided free of charge for tourists for living there up to three days. Like monastic living, they are sex segregated and rooms have to be shared.

Big Buddha of Donglin

Public Access
Unlike many tourist sites in China, visitors are not required to buy any tickets in this temple. On the contrary, tourists can have free vegetarian meals together with monks (at 6:00–6:30, 11:00–11:30, 17:00–17:30) after joining their religious nianfo exercises.

Abbot
The current abbot of the temple, Master Da'an, was a professor of Beijing University of International Business and Economics.

See also
Various other places are named for the temple, including Donglin Academy and Tōrin-in.

Gallery

References

Bibliography

External links
 

386 establishments
Buddhist temples in Jiangxi
Buildings and structures in Jiangxi
Chinese architectural history
Religious organizations established in the 4th century
Tourist attractions in Jiangxi
Religion in Jiangxi
4th-century establishments in China
4th-century Buddhist temples